El Borouj is a town in Settat Province, Casablanca-Settat, Morocco. According to the 2004 census, it has a population of 16,222.

References

Populated places in Settat Province
Municipalities of Morocco